Masai is a name of Kenyan origin that may refer to:

Given name
Masai Ujiri (born 1970), English-born Nigerian basketball executive and former basketball player

Surname
Andrew Masai (born 1960), Kenyan long-distance runner 
Edith Masai (born 1967), Kenyan long-distance runner and three-time World Cross Country champion
Hikaru Masai or Hikaru (born 1987), Japanese pop singer
Linet Masai (born 1989), Kenyan long-distance runner and 2009 world champion
Moses Ndiema Masai (born 1986), Kenyan long-distance runner and world medallist, brother of Linet
Samwel Chebolei Masai (born 2001), Kenyan middle-distance runner

See also
Barmasai, a related Kenyan name meaning "one who has killed or captured a Masai"

References

Surnames of Kenyan origin
Kenyan names